Little Conewago Creek is a  tributary of Conewago Creek in York County, Pennsylvania in the United States.

Little Conewago Creek joins the Conewago Creek between the boroughs of York Haven and Manchester.

References

Gertler, Edward. Keystone Canoeing, Seneca Press, 2004.

See also
List of rivers of Pennsylvania

Rivers of Pennsylvania
Tributaries of the Susquehanna River
Rivers of York County, Pennsylvania